The In Blue Tour is the third concert tour by Irish band, The Corrs. Promoting their third studio album, In Blue, the tour performed in Europe, North America, Australasia and Asia. The band performed over shows beginning October 2000 until October 2001.

Opening act
Picturehouse (31 October – 18 November 2000)
Brian Kennedy (20–22 December 2000, 8–19 January 2001, 14–16 March 2001, 1–11 April 2001)
BBMak (6 April 2001)
David Gray (11–17 October 2001) 
Nigel Kennedy (25 October 2001)

Setlist
The following setlist is obtained from the 31 October 2000 concert at the Alsterdorfer Sporthalle in Hamburg, Germany. It does not represent all concerts during the tour.
"Instrumental Sequence" (contains elements of "(Lough) Erin Shore")
"Only When I Sleep"
"Give Me a Reason"
"Irresistible"
"Forgiven, Not Forgotten"
"What Can I Do?"
"Joy of Life"
"Hurt Before"
"Somebody For Someone"
"Dreams"
"The Right Time"
"I Never Loved You Anyway"
"Runaway"
"All the Love in the World"
"Old Town"
"All in a Day"
"Queen of Hollywood"
"Paddy McCarthy"
"Radio"
"No More Cry"
"Breathless"
Encore

Band Introduction
"At Your Side"
"So Young"
"Toss the Feathers"

Tour dates

Festivals and other miscellaneous performances
World Aids Days Concert 
VH1 Music Awards
Vogue Takes over Miami 
Christmas in Washington
92 PRO-FM Jingle Mingle
QBash
Charity concert benefiting the Freeman Hospital
Zootopia
Kiss Concert 2001
Goodwill Games Opening Ceremony

Cancellations and rescheduled shows

Personnel

Band
Andrea Corr (lead vocals, tin whistle)
Sharon Corr (violin, vocals)
Caroline Corr (drums, bodhran, piano, vocals)
Jim Corr (guitars, keyboards, vocals)
Keith Duffy (bass)
Anthony Drennan (lead guitar)

Management & Agents
John Hughes (manager)
Emma Hill (management assistant)
John Giddings at Solo ITG (international agent)
Barry Gaster (Irish agent)

The Crew
Henry McGroggan (tour manager)
Aiden Lee (production manager)
Liam McCarthy (lighting designer)
Max Bisgrove (sound engineer)
Paul 'Mini' Moore (monitor engineer)
Declan Hogan (drum technician)
John Parsons (guitar technician)
Oisin Murray (midi technician)
Jay Mascrey (makeup)

Broadcasts and recordings
On 21 December 2000 The Corrs performed a Christmas show at Wembley Arena which was broadcast live on Sky One. The recording was later edited and released as a live DVD named "The Corrs: Live in London".
An Access All Arenas Documentary which was recorded in Sweden, Stockholm at Stockholm Globe Arena.
After Christmas The Corrs did a charity concert in Newcastle upon Tyne at the Telewest Arena on lung Cancer
In 2001 on Band's Australia Tour Arena TV recorded A Day in the Life seeing a promo day for the band and the in and out of being a superstar. (Also included live footage from 1 September in Sydney)

References

The Corrs concert tours
2000 concert tours
2001 concert tours